Vulcaniella rosmarinella is a moth of the family Cosmopterigidae. It is found in the area surrounding the Mediterranean Sea, as far east as Crete. It is also found in North Africa.

The wingspan is 7–8 mm. Adults are on wing from the end of May to July.

The larvae feed on Rosmarinus officinalis. They mine the leaves of their host plant. The mine consists of an upper-surface inflated blotch. The inner wall of the blotch is lined with silk. The larva moves to a new leaf a few times, penetrating it from below. Pupation takes place within the mine.

External links
bladmineerders.nl
Fauna Europaea

Vulcaniella
Moths of Europe
Moths described in 1891